Cyrtodactylus mimikanus, also known as the false bow-fingered gecko, the Mimika bow-fingered gecko, or Mimika bent-toed gecko,  is a species of gecko that is endemic to Papua New Guinea.

References 

Cyrtodactylus
Reptiles described in 1914